Rodrigo Hernán Lloreda Caicedo (2 September 1942 — 4 February 2000) was a Colombian lawyer and politician who was appointed to several senior positions under different presidents, with both domestic and foreign affairs responsibilities, beginning in 1968 as appointed governor of his department and briefly as ambassador to the United States. In his last post, Lloreda was the 17th Minister of National Defence, serving under President Andrés Pastrana Arango from 1998 to 1999.

Early life and education
Born on 2 September 1942 in Santiago de Cali, Valle del Cauca, Rodrigo Hernán was the youngest of three children of Álvaro Lloreda Caicedo, a wealthy Colombian industrialist and politician, who in 1949 founded the newspaper El Pais (Cali), which he directed for 25 years. His mother was Mercedes Caicedo Ortiz, from Costa Rica.

His family´s political and economic status meant that Lloreda received a privileged education. After attending the Colegio Berchmans in Cali, he completed most of his primary and secondary studies abroad, first in Switzerland at the École nouvelle de la Suisse romande; then in the United States at the Nyack School for Boys in Nyack, New York; and the Georgetown Preparatory School in Rockville, Maryland. He returned to Colombia after his graduation and was accepted to the Pontifical Xavierian University, where he graduated in 1965 with a Bachelor of Laws.

Career
Lloreda became active in the Conservative party, in which his family had held offices for two generations.  In 1968 at the age of 26, he was appointed to a four-year term by the President of Colombia as the 51st Governor of Valle del Cauca, his home province. (Since 1991, governors have been elected by popular vote.)

He also served in other appointed positions: as the 22nd Permanent Representative of Colombia to the United Nations, Ambassador to the United States (1986), the 63rd Minister of National Education, and as Minister of Foreign Affairs of Colombia. In his last position, he was appointed as the 17th Minister of National Defence, serving under President Andrés Pastrana Arango from 1998 to 1999. Lloreda died of cancer in February 2000.

Marriage and family
Lloreda met Aura Lucía Mera Becerra while he was attending the Pontifical Xavierian University, and they married on 5 December 1964 in Bogotá. Together they had four children: twin boys, Rodrigo and Francisco José; María Mercedes, and Aura Lucía.  The couple divorced in 1971.

On 12 October 1974 Lloreda married again, to the folk singer María Eugenia Piedrahíta Plata. They have a daughter, María Eugenia.

References 

1942 births
2000 deaths
Rodrigo
People from Cali
Colombian people of Costa Rican descent
Pontifical Xavierian University alumni
20th-century Colombian lawyers
Colombian Conservative Party politicians
Governors of Valle del Cauca Department
Presidential Designates of Colombia
Colombian Ministers of National Education
Foreign ministers of Colombia
Colombian Ministers of Defense
Colombian politicians